Rhodobium orientis is a phototrophic, Gram-negative, rod-shaped and motile bacterium species from the genus of Rhodobium which has been isolated from coastal seawater from Makurazaki in Japan.

References

Further reading

External links 
Type strain of Rhodobium orientis at BacDive -  the Bacterial Diversity Metadatabase

Hyphomicrobiales
Bacteria described in 1995